Jeffrey Sparidaans (born 8 September 1993) is a Dutch professional darts player, currently playing in Professional Darts Corporation events.

Career
In 2015, Sparidaans won the Czech Open. In 2016, he won the Swiss Open. in 2017, he won the England Classic and Hungarian Classic. He has qualified for the 2018 BDO World Darts Championship as the 25th seed and will play Dennis Nilsson in the Preliminary Round.

Sparidaans qualified for a PDC tour card for the first time at the 2023 Q-School, defeating Ronny Huybrechts on the first day.

World Championship results

BDO
 2018: Preliminary round (lost to Dennis Nilsson 0-3)

External links
 Jeffrey Sparidaans' profile and stats on Darts Database

References

Living people
Dutch darts players
British Darts Organisation players
Professional Darts Corporation current tour card holders
1993 births